Andselv is a village in Målselv Municipality in Troms og Finnmark county, Norway. The village lies along the Andselva river in the urban area called Bardufoss.

References

Villages in Troms
Populated places of Arctic Norway
Målselv